List of Russian royal mistresses and lovers includes  mistresses, minions, favourites and simply lovers of the Russian emperors and reigning empresses before and after coronation.

18th century

Peter I 
 Anna Mons — official favourite
 Anisya Kirillovna Tolstaya
 Varvara Michajlovna Arsen'eva — possibly
 Maria Rumyantseva — possibly
 Mary Hamilton
 Letitia Cross
 Avdotya Chernysheva — possibly
 Elżbieta Sieniawska — possibly
 Maria Cantemir — official favourite

Catherine I 
 Boris Sheremetev — before meeting with Peter I
 Alexander Danilovich Menshikov — before meeting with Peter I
 Willem Mons — before coronation
 Piotr Paweł Sapieha — possibly
 Reinhold Gustaw von Loewenwolde

Anna 
 Pyotr Bestuzhev-Ryumin — before coronation
 Ernst Johann von Biron — official favourite

Regent Anna Leopoldovna 
 Moritz Karl zu Lynar
 Julia von Mengden

Elizabeth 
 Alexander Buturlin — before coronation
 Semyon Kirillovich Naryshkin — before coronation
 Alexey Yakovlevich Shubin — before coronation
 Alexei Razumovsky — official favourite, possibly husband
 Pimen Lyalin
 Nikita Beketov
 Ivan Shuvalov — official favourite

Peter III 
 Elizaveta Vorontsova

Catherine the Great 
 see also: :ru:Список мужчин Екатерины II
 Sergei Saltykov (1726–1765) — in 1752—1754 (before coronation).
 Stanisław August Poniatowski — in 1756—1758 (before coronation). Possibly father of the Grand Duchess Anna Petrovna.
 Grigory Orlov — lover since 1759/1760, official favourite in 1762–1772. Father of her illegitimate son Aleksey Grigorievich Bobrinsky (see Bobrinsky family).
 Alexander Vasilchikov — official favourite in 1772–1774.
 Grigory Potemkin — official favourite since 1774 until death, but lover until 1776. Possibly husband and father of illegitimate Elizabeth Grigorieva Temkina.
 Pyotr Zavadovsky — official favourite in 1776—1777
 Semyon Zorich — official favourite in 1777—1778
 Ivan Rimsky-Korsakov — official favourite in 1778—1779
 Alexander Lanskoy — official favourite in 1780—1784
 Alexander Yermolov — official favourite in 1785—1786
 Alexander Dmitriev-Mamonov — official favourite in 1786—1789
 Platon Zubov — official favourite in 1789—1796

Paul I 
 Sophia Razumovskaya — before coronation, had a son illegitimate Semen Velikiy.
 Olga Zherebtsova — before coronation
 Yekaterina Nelidova — official favourite
 Anna Lopukhina — official favourite
 Madame Chevalier
 Mavra Isidorovna Yuryeva, mother of the illegitimate Marfa Pavlovna Musina-Yuryeva.

19th century

Alexander I 
 Ekaterina Torsukova — before coronation
 Sofia Meshcherskaya — before coronation, possibly mother of the illegitimate Nikolai Lukash.
 Maria Naryshkina — official favourite, mother of many his illegitimate children, survived only Sofia Naryshkina.
 Varvara Turkestanova
 Marguerite Georges — possibly
 Marie-Thérèse Bourgoin

Nicholas I 
 Anna-Maria Charlota de Rutenskiold - before coronation
 Varvara Yakovleva
 Varvara Nelidova — official favourite
 Ekaterina Petrovna Mussina-Pushkina — possibly, rumoured illegitimate daughter, Sofia Sergeyevna Trubetskaya

Alexander II 
 Alexandra Albedinskaya
 Catherine Dolgorukova — official favourite, later wife. Mother of four illegitimate children (see Yuryevsky family).

Alexander III 
 Marija Mesjtjerskaja — before coronation. First love, possibly not lover.

Nicholas II 
 Geisha Mooroka O-Matsu (Моорока О-Мацу) — during voyage in Japan in 1891. Before coronation.
 Mathilde Kschessinska — before coronation.

References

Sources
 Гельбиг Г. фон. Русские избранники. — М, 1999. = Georg Adolf Wilhelm Von Helbig. Russische Günstlinge. Tübingen, J.G. Cotta, 1809.

R